Cynoglossus is a genus of fish in the family Cynoglossidae. Most species are indigenous to the Indo-Pacific region, but there are also a few in warmer parts of the East Atlantic. They are commonly found in shallow waters on a muddy or sandy bottom, including estuaries and a few species are restricted to fresh water. One species Cynoglossus sinusarabici has invaded the Mediterranean Sea through the Suez Canal from the Red Sea, a process known as Lessepsian or Erythrean migration.

Species
There are currently 67 recognized species in this genus:
 Cynoglossus abbreviatus (J. E. Gray, 1834) (Three-lined tongue sole)
 Cynoglossus acaudatus Gilchrist, 1906 (Natal tongue sole)
 Cynoglossus acutirostris Norman, 1939 (Sharp-nose tongue sole)
 Cynoglossus arel (Bloch & J. G. Schneider, 1801) (Large-scale tongue sole)
 Cynoglossus attenuatus Gilchrist, 1904

 Cynoglossus brachycephalus Bleeker, 1870 
 Cynoglossus broadhursti Waite, 1905 (Southern tongue sole)
 Cynoglossus browni Chabanaud, 1949 (Nigerian tongue sole)
 Cynoglossus cadenati Chabanaud, 1947 (Ghanaian tongue sole)
 Cynoglossus canariensis Steindachner, 1882 (Canary tongue sole)
 Cynoglossus capensis (Kaup, 1858) (Sand tongue sole)
 Cynoglossus carpenteri Alcock, 1889 (Hooked tongue sole)
 Cynoglossus crepida Fricke, Golani & Appelbaum-Golani, 2017, (Bluntnose deepwater tongue sole)
 Cynoglossus cynoglossus (F. Hamilton, 1822) (Bengal tongue sole)
 Cynoglossus dispar F. Day, 1877 (Round-head tongue sole)
 Cynoglossus dollfusi (Chabanaud, 1931)  
 Cynoglossus dubius F. Day, 1873 (Carrot tongue sole)
 Cynoglossus durbanensis Regan, 1921 (Durban tongue sole)
 Cynoglossus feldmanni (Bleeker, 1854) (River tongue sole)
 Cynoglossus gilchristi Regan, 1920 (Ripple-fin tongue sole)
 Cynoglossus gracilis Günther, 1873
 Cynoglossus heterolepis M. C. W. Weber, 1910 (Freshwater tongue sole)
 Cynoglossus interruptus Günther, 1880 (Genko tongue sole)
 Cynoglossus itinus (Snyder, 1909) 
 Cynoglossus joyneri Günther, 1878 (Red tongue sole)
 Cynoglossus kapuasensis Fowler, 1905
 Cynoglossus kopsii (Bleeker, 1851) (Short-headed tongue sole)
 Cynoglossus lachneri Menon, 1977 (Lachner's tongue sole)
 Cynoglossus lida (Bleeker, 1851) (Rough-scale tongue sole)
 Cynoglossus lighti Norman, 1925
 Cynoglossus lineolatus Steindachner, 1867
 Cynoglossus lingua F. Hamilton, 1822 (Long tongue sole)
 Cynoglossus maccullochi Norman, 1926
 Cynoglossus macrolepidotus (Bleeker, 1851)
 Cynoglossus macrophthalmus Norman, 1926 (Big-eyed tongue sole)
 Cynoglossus macrostomus Norman, 1928 (Malabar tongue sole)
 Cynoglossus maculipinnis Rendahl (de), 1921
 Cynoglossus marleyi Regan, 1921 
 Cynoglossus melampetalus (J. Richardson, 1846)
 Cynoglossus microlepis (Bleeker, 1851) (Small-scale tongue sole)
 Cynoglossus monodi Chabanaud, 1949 (Guinean tongue sole)
 Cynoglossus monopus (Bleeker, 1849)
 Cynoglossus nanhaiensis Z. M. Wang, Munroe & X. Y. Kong, 2016 (Nanhai tongue sole) 
 Cynoglossus nigropinnatus Ochiai, 1963
 Cynoglossus ochiaii Yokogawa, Endo & Sakaji, 2008
 Cynoglossus ogilbyi Norman, 1926
 Cynoglossus oligolepis (Bleeker, 1855)
 Cynoglossus pottii Steindachner, 1902
 Cynoglossus praecisus Alcock, 1890 
 Cynoglossus puncticeps (J. Richardson, 1846) (Speckled tongue sole)
 Cynoglossus purpureomaculatus Regan, 1905 
 Cynoglossus quadrilineatus (Bleeker, 1851) (Four-lined tongue sole) 
 Cynoglossus quadriocellatus  R. Fricke, 2020 
 Cynoglossus robustus Günther, 1873
 Cynoglossus roulei H. W. Wu, 1932
 Cynoglossus sealarki Regan, 1908
 Cynoglossus semifasciatus F. Day, 1877 (Bengal tongue sole)
 Cynoglossus semilaevis Günther, 1873 (Tongue sole)
 Cynoglossus senegalensis (Kaup, 1858) (Senegalese tongue sole)
 Cynoglossus sibogae M. C. W. Weber, 1913
 Cynoglossus sinicus H. W. Wu, 1932
 Cynoglossus sinusarabici (Chabanaud, 1931) (Red Sea tongue sole)
 Cynoglossus suyeni Fowler, 1934
 Cynoglossus trigrammus Günther, 1862
 Cynoglossus trulla (Cantor, 1849) (Macau tongue sole)
 Cynoglossus versicolor Alcock, 1890 
 Cynoglossus waandersii (Bleeker, 1854)
 Cynoglossus xiphoideus Günther, 1862 
 Cynoglossus zanzibarensis Norman, 1939 (Zanzibar tongue sole)

References

Cynoglossidae
Ray-finned fish genera
Taxa named by Francis Buchanan-Hamilton